Rowing at the 1980 Summer Olympics was represented by 14 events. It took place in the Man-made Basin, located at the Trade Unions Olympic Sports Centre (Krylatskoye district, Moscow). The rowing schedule began on 20 July and ended on 27 July.

Due to the Western boycott some strong rowing nations were not present. In that situation East Germany dominated the competition: they won 14 medals, including 11 golds, from 14 events.

The quadruple sculls events, introduced in 1976, were again held without coxswain for men and with coxswain for women.

Participating nations
A total of 470 rowers from 25 nations competed at the Moscow Games:

Medal table

Medal summary

Men's events

Women's events

References

 
1980 Summer Olympics events
1980
Summer Olympics